Puji Town is a rural town in Liuyang City, Hunan Province, People's Republic of China. It borders Gejia Town in the north, Zhentou Town in the northwest, Guanqiao Town in the west, Guanzhuang Town of Liling in the south, and Chengchong Town in the east.

Administrative division
The town is divided into six villages and three communities, the following areas: 
 Xinfu Community
 Jinjiang Community
 Xinjie Community
 Putai Village
 Puhua Village
 Shuyuan New Village
 Dajitou Village
 Wufeng Village
 Puguan Village

Geography
Liuyang River, also known as the mother river, flows through the town.

There are a number of popular mountains located immediately adjacent to the townsite which include Mount Jiziling; Mount Huangmaojian and Mount Baimaojian.

Economy
The principal industries in the area are agriculture, forestry and fireworks.

Education
 Puji Middle School

Transportation

Expressway
The Liuyang-Liling Expressway in Hunan leads to Liling through the town.

County roads
The town is connected to three county roads: X016, X017 and X018.

Religion
Wanshou Palace is a Taoist temple situated at the town.

Attractions
Jiazhou Isle is a well-known scenic spot. Besides, the Jinjiang military education centre 
(), which is formally the No. 7 senior high school of Liuyang, is also an important tourist spot in Puji town.

Notable people
 Ouyang Zhonghu, educator.
 He Jishan, an academician of the Chinese Academy of Engineering.

References

Divisions of Liuyang
Liuyang